San Juan Talpa is a municipality in the La Paz department of El Salvador. 

Municipalities of the La Paz Department (El Salvador)